André Hofschneider (born 10 June 1970) is a German football former player who last managed Union Berlin.

References

External links

1970 births
Living people
Footballers from Berlin
German footballers
1. FC Union Berlin players
FC Hansa Rostock players
TSV 1860 Munich players
Arminia Bielefeld players
FC Augsburg players
Bundesliga players
2. Bundesliga players
2. Bundesliga managers
1. FC Union Berlin managers
East German footballers
DDR-Oberliga players
Association football midfielders
German football managers
1. FC Union Berlin non-playing staff